Testechiniscus is a genus of tardigrades in the family Echiniscidae. The genus was named and described by Reinhardt Kristensen in 1987.

Species
The genus includes four species:
 Testechiniscus laterculus (Schuster, Grigarick & Toftner, 1980)
 Testechiniscus macronyx (Richters, 1907)
 Testechiniscus meridionalis (Murray, 1906)
 Testechiniscus spitsbergensis (Scourfield, 1897)

References

Further reading
 Kristensen, 1987 : Generic revision of the Echiniscidae (Heterotardigrada), with a discussion of the origin of the family. Collana U.Z.I. Selected Symposia and Monographs, no. 1, p. 261-335.
 Nomenclator Zoologicus info

Echiniscidae
Tardigrade genera